Light a Distant Fire is a 1988 historical novel by Lucia St. Clair Robson that fictionalizes the story of the Second Seminole War, Andrew Jackson, and the charismatic leader Osceola, warchief of the Seminole tribe.

Footnotes

External links
Light a Distant Fire at Lucia St. Clair Robson's website

1988 American novels
American historical novels
Cultural depictions of Andrew Jackson
Seminole Wars
Novels by Lucia St. Clair Robson
Novels set in Florida
Ballantine Books books